Patricia Schillinger (born 18 January 1963) is a member of the Senate of France, representing the Haut-Rhin department since 2004. She is the mayor of the French village of Hégenheim, in Alsace.
she was a member of the Socialist Party until 2017, when she moved to La République En Marche!

References
Page on the Senate website (in French)

1963 births
Living people
French Senators of the Fifth Republic
Women mayors of places in France
Socialist Party (France) politicians
21st-century French women politicians
Women members of the Senate (France)
La République En Marche! politicians
Senators of Haut-Rhin
Writers from Strasbourg